Guilt is an American mystery drama television series that premiered on Freeform on June 13, 2016. The series was created by Kathryn Price and Nichole Millard, and produced by Lionsgate Television. Freeform gave a pilot order in June 2015, and picked the show up to series in November 2015. On October 20, 2016, Freeform announced they had canceled the series after one season.

Daisy Head stars as Grace Atwood, an American student in London whose roommate, Molly Ryan, is murdered. As people begin suspecting her, they start to accuse her of the crime. The show features an ensemble cast with Head as Grace Atwood, Emily Tremaine as Grace's sister, Billy Zane as the defense lawyer hired to protect Grace, Cristian Solimeno and Naomi Ryan as two members of the police, Sam Cassidy as a member of the British Royal Family, Simona Brown and Zachary Fall as acquaintances of Grace, and Kevin Ryan as Molly Ryan's brother.

Plot 
Young student Grace Atwood finds herself in a mess when her best friend, Molly Ryan, is murdered, and she becomes the prime suspect of the crime. Grace's sister, Natalie, is beside her at all costs, but does not know whether to believe what Grace says. While the London police investigate the murder, members of the high-end sex club Courtenay continue to practice their explicit and secret nights of sex with prostitutes. There are many suspected of having murdered Molly, but, in all that time, was Grace guilty of the murder, or she was just a young lady caught in the journalistic spotlight and the hard investigation regime?

Cast and characters

Main 
 Daisy Head as Grace Atwood: An American college student living in London who is accused of murder after her roommate Molly is found dead in their flat.
 Emily Tremaine as Natalie Atwood: An Assistant District Attorney from Boston who flies to London to support Grace after learning her younger sister is implicated in Molly's murder.
 Cristian Solimeno as D.S. Alex Bruno: The one who leads the Molly Ryan murder case. He also begins to develop feelings for Natalie Atwood.
 Naomi Ryan as Gwendolyn "Gwen" Hall: A Crown Prosecutor assigned to the Molly Ryan case who had a previous sexual relationship with D.S. Bruno.
 Simona Brown as Roz Walters: An up-and-coming British DJ living with Grace and Molly who lives a double life as a worker at a high-end sex club.
 Zachary Fall as Luc Pascal: A drug-addicted artist and Grace's boyfriend who becomes a prime suspect in Molly's murder.
 Kevin Ryan as Patrick Ryan: Molly's older brother who wants retribution for his sister's death.
 Sam Cassidy as Prince Theo: A member of the British Royal Family and a client of high-end sex clubs who shares a personal connection with Molly.
 Billy Zane as Stan Gutterie: A lawyer who is hired by James (Grace's and Natalie's step father) to help Grace.

Recurring and guest 

 Robbie Gee as Pike: A Detective Chief Inspector who is involved in Molly Ryan's case, and a best friend to Alex.
 Amber Jean Rowan as Kaley: A young Irish girl, who became a prostitute at the Courtenay sex-club and was Roz's lover before she quit the sex club and fell in love with Patrick.
 Osi Okerafor as Phillip Baker: The right-hand man to Prince Theo and the one responsible for covering up the Prince's tracks in Molly's murder scene.
 Sujaya Dasgupta as Veena Patel: An aspiring, smart and elegant journalist who does everything to get attention for her career.
 Rebekah Wainwright as Molly Ryan: A college student who was murdered in the flat where she lived with her two best friends, Roz and Grace. Molly was involved with Professor Geoffrey Linley, and was an enemy of Geoffrey's wife, Beatrice. Molly also worked as a prostitute at the Courtenay sex-club before her death. She was pregnant of Prince Theo when she was murdered. It is revealed that Luc Pascal is her killer.
 Katie Clarkson-Hill as Charlotte Crockleby: Prince Theo's soon-to-be wife who discovers that the Prince is involved with prostitutes.

 Anthony Head as James: Grace's and Natalie's step father who was involved with the Russian mafia.
 Ryan Gerald as Neville Harris: A young man who lived in the building next door to Molly and Grace and was stalking Molly. Neville has a mental illness and is hospitalized in a nursing home when he tries to hurt Grace. However, Neville later becomes a witness to what happened to Molly.
 Michael Lindall as Finch: One of those responsible for maintaining the Courtenay sex-club hidden and private.
 Jonathan Howard as Josh: A police officer who was responsible for carrying over Grace when she was accused of killing Molly. He briefly helped Grace to flee, but was stopped when she gave up and the two had a car accident.
 Mark Letheren as Professor Geoffrey Linley: A teacher at Grace's and Molly's university who was sexually involved with both of them.
 Sam O'Mahony as Declan Ryan: A member of Molly's and Patrick's family who helped Patrick to undermine the prince.
 Emma Davies as Beatrice Linley: Geoffrey's wife who discovered his involvement with students, and who later killed him.

Episodes

Reception 
Guilt received mixed to favorable reviews. On Rotten Tomatoes, the series holds a 60% approval rating based on 10 critics. The site's critical consensus reads: "Guilt stumbles through over-packed twists, weak dialogue, and unrealistic behavior, yet ultimately emerges as a fun, sensationalized soap". On Metacritic, the first season of the show holds a 52 out of 100 Metascore based on 8 reviews, indicating "mixed or average reviews".

References

External links 
 
 Guilt at Freeform
 

2016 American television series debuts
2016 American television series endings
2010s American drama television series
2010s American mystery television series
English-language television shows
Freeform (TV channel) original programming
Television shows set in London
Television series by Lionsgate Television